Some Assembly Required is a teen situation comedy series that aired on YTV in Canada and streams on Netflix (seasons 1–2) and Amazon Prime Video (season 3) worldwide. Produced in Burnaby, British Columbia, it was created by Dan Signer (The Suite Life on Deck, A.N.T. Farm, Mr. Young) & Howard Nemetz, and stars Kolton Stewart, Charlie Storwick, Harrison Houde, Sydney Scotia, Dylan Playfair, Travis Turner and Ellie Harvie. The first season, with 26 episodes, began airing in January 2014; the series finale aired on June 6, 2016. The first season was first streamed on Netflix in 2015, followed by the second season.

Premise
Jarvis Raines (Kolton Stewart) is an average 14-year-old who becomes a boss overnight after he sues a toy company over a defective chemistry set that blows up his house. Jarvis' first act as CEO of Knickknack Toys is to fire Candace (Ellie Harvey), the former CEO. He recruits a diverse group of kids from his high school to help him run the company. Usually, something backfires when they are trying to develop a new toy. Before the end credits, there are usually advertisements showing Knickknack Toys' newest products, which are shown or often invented in said episode, as well as P. Everett Knickknack telling the viewer, "The p stands for (word that begins with p)".

Episodes

Cast and characters

Main 
Kolton Stewart as Jarvis Raines, a fun-loving teenager who becomes the new owner of Knickknack Toys, after suing the company when a defective chemistry set he got blows up his house on Christmas. Over time he develops feelings for Piper, whom he begins dating in season 3.
 Charlie Storwick as Piper Gray, a tech-savvy, sardonic goth 'hacker chick' who is hired by Jarvis as the Chief Technology Officer and the vice president of the company. She has had a huge crush on Jarvis since before being hired by him but never had told him until they began dating in the third season.
 Harrison Houde as Bowie Sherman, Jarvis' weird best friend who is the first to get hired by him. He gets ideas ranging from bad to worse, including taking words seriously. Even so, he is still like everyone's lovable little brother. In Season 1 Episode 3, Jarvis puts him in charge of the Joke and Prank Division.
 Sydney Scotia as Geneva Hayes, a beautiful yet dimwitted teenage girl who "works" as the receptionist and Jarvis's personal executive assistant. Jarvis, like many other boys at his school, has a huge crush on her until he develops feelings for Piper. Despite her apparent lack of intelligence, she has a few hidden talents, such as being able to solve a puzzle cube (like Rubik's Cube) faster than a robot.
 Travis Turner as Aster Vanderberg, the creative, confident and fashionable chief design officer of Knickknack Toys. He is also the only one who knows about Piper's crush on Jarvis, and has promised not to tell anyone, because, as he says "he likes to keep his conversations interesting". Aster also has some twisted pleasure in always insulting and mocking Piper and everyone on how they dress, even to the point that when he called in sick, he asked Bowie to fill in for his "job" of making fun of her. In the episode "Realm of Raiders", Piper goes to Aster for advice on if she should kiss Jarvis or not, to which Aster kisses Piper and says "I wouldn't risk it".
 Dylan Playfair as Malcolm "Knox" Knoxford III, an amateur extreme sports daredevil who is dimwitted. He is recruited as the product and safety tester and human crash test dummy. He likes a brand of clothing called "Epic Thunder" and also likes playing with boxes.
 Ellie Harvie as Candace Wheeler, the previous owner of Knickknack and the only adult in the main cast of characters. She refused to give Jarvis a settlement after selling him a defective chemistry set that blew up his house, and the jury awarded the company to Jarvis as compensation instead. She has high doubts that Jarvis can run a company, but is always proved wrong in the end. She masquerades as Knickknack's janitor Mrs. Bubkes, an old woman from the fictional Eastern European country Meeskatania, to spy on Jarvis in hopes of regaining control of the company. She frequently attempts to sabotage Jarvis' plans in secret, with occasional help from her adopted daughter Adelaide, to no avail.

Recurring 
Russell Roberts as P. Everett Knickknack (Season 1 for human version), the original owner of Knickknack toys since 1943 who pops out of nowhere one day. Everyone thinks he is a fraud trying to steal the company, especially Bowie, who thinks he is Candace. Even though he was proven innocent, it is unknown whether or not he is an impostor. Throughout the show, he and his cartoon counterpart use a running gag to say words and sentences that start with the letter 'P' because the 'P' in "P. Everett Knickknack" is unknown. In Season 1 Episode 7, Knickknack is said to be dead, though that is proven wrong.
 Mmmboing is a rubber bouncing ball that was created by Bowie in the pilot and has not stopped bouncing since. Mmmboing has become a running gag in the series appearing somewhere in almost every episode.
Nils Hognestad as Mr. Gournisht (Season 1–2), a recurring character that appears in "Lobster Trap", "Flycycle", and "Rocket with a Pocket". He is a Meesketanian-born man who is fluent in both Meesketanian and English. Mr. Gournisht is deeply in love with Mrs. Bubkes (Candace's alter-ego) but has no interest in Candace Wheeler. He works as an astronaut, working on the "Meeska-foot".
Chelsea Miller as Adelaide (Season 2-3), a girl from an orphanage that Candace used to fake a home video of her alter-ego Mrs. Bubkes as a child and later decided to adopt because they have a lot in common. The adoption agency did not allow Candace to adopt Adelaide due to her bad reputation, so she disguises herself as Mrs. Bubkes to officially adopt her.

Production
The series was created and executive produced by Dan Signer and Howard Nemetz and produced in Burnaby, British Columbia. The series was renewed for a second season in June 2014. On August 19, 2015, the series was renewed for a third season. On January 7, 2017, YTV canceled their #1 series and aired the 13-episode third season on their network.

References

External links
  – on YTV
 

2010s Canadian high school television series
2010s Canadian teen sitcoms
2014 Canadian television series debuts
2016 Canadian television series endings
English-language television shows
YTV (Canadian TV channel) original programming
Television series about teenagers
Television series created by Dan Signer
Television series set in fictional countries
Television shows filmed in Burnaby
Television series by Corus Entertainment